Peredo is a surname. Notable people with the surname include:

Daniel Peredo (1969–2018), Peruvian journalist, announcer and writer
Julio César Pérez Peredo (born 1991), Bolivian footballer
Melchor Peredo (born 1927), Mexican muralist 
Osvaldo Peredo (born 1941), Bolivian physician and revolutionary leader
Rosalía Peredo, Mexican politician